Carbolic soap, sometimes referred to as red soap, is a mildly antiseptic soap containing carbolic acid (phenol) and/or cresylic acid (cresol), both of which are phenols derived from either coal tar or petroleum sources.

History
In 1834, German chemist Friedlieb Ferdinand Runge discovered a phenol, also known as carbolic acid, which he derived in an impure form from coal tar.  In August 1865, Dr. Joseph Lister applied a piece of lint dipped in carbolic acid solution to the wound of an eleven-year-old boy at Glasgow Royal Infirmary, who had sustained a compound fracture after a cart wheel had passed over his leg. After four days, he renewed the pad and discovered that no infection had developed, and after a total of six weeks he was amazed to discover that the boy's bones had fused back together, without the danger of suppuration.

One of the earliest manufacturers of carbolic soap was F. C. Calvert and Company of Manchester, England, established in 1859 and taken over by Unilever in 1965. 
In the United States, the license for manufacturing carbolic soap was held by James Buchan and Company.
In 1894, William Lever, 1st Viscount Leverhulme, introduced the Lifebuoy brand of carbolic soap to the market.

Features
One of the distinctive features of this soap is its deep pink to red colour, which was and still is added to the soap to designate it as Carbolic Soap.  The addition of the red colour was deemed important due to the fact that when Carbolic Soap was first introduced to the general public it was the only germicidal soap available. Carbolic acid is used in a wide range of industrial and consumer product applications and can be a skin irritant.

Uses
It is still distributed to disaster victims for routine hygiene by the Red Cross and other relief organisations.

See also
 List of cleaning products

References 

Disinfectants
Soaps